Return of Grey Wolf is a 1926 silent film action adventure produced by William Steiner and released by an independent company, Ambassador. It stars a dog named 'Leader' and can be found on DVD from Grapevine video.

Cast
Leader the Dog - Grey Wolf (aka Long Tail)
James Pierce - Louis LaRue
Helen Lynch - Jean St. Claire
Walter Shumway - Gaston Pacot
Edward Coxen - Charles Hendrickson, Owner of Trading Post
Lionel Belmore - Jacques St. Claire
Whitehorse - Abe Hawkins

References

External links
Return of Grey Wolf at IMDb.com
allmovie synopsis
lobby poster

1926 films
American silent feature films
American black-and-white films
1920s action adventure films
American action adventure films
1920s American films
Silent action adventure films
1920s English-language films